CHEC-FM is a First Nations community radio station that operates at 93.7 FM in Mistawasis First Nation, Saskatchewan, Canada.

Owned by Director of Operations, Mistawasis First Nations Radio, the station received Canadian Radio-television and Telecommunications Commission approval on February 14, 2011.

CHEC-FM airs locally produced programming, while its remaining programming is from the MBC radio network.

References

External links

Hec
Radio stations established in 2011
2011 establishments in Saskatchewan